Michael Francis Branch, known as Mike Branch (born 1965), served from 1996 to 2000 as the Louisiana State Senator from District 13 (East Baton Rouge, East Feliciana, and Livingston parishes). Branch unseated incumbent Democratic Senator Mike Cross, a former Mayor of Baker in East Baton Rouge Parish.

Background
An Eagle Scout, Branch graduated from Central High School and Louisiana State University in Baton Rouge, where he procured Bachelor of General Studies and Master of Public Administration degrees. He was a  Second Lieutenant in the Louisiana Army National Guard. Prior to his State Senate term, Branch was a member of the East Baton Rouge Parish School Board. He is a commercial pilot.

Political career

In 1990, Branch was elected to the District 11 seat on the 12-member East Baton Rouge Parish School Board. He led in the primary held on October 6, 1990, 4,945 votes (42.4 percent), and went into the general election with the one-term incumbent Democrat Gordon Herbert Hutchinson, Sr. (born 1921), who received 4,091 votes (35.1 percent). In the lower-turnout second balloting on November 6, Branch defeated Hutchinson, 4,247 votes (63.4 percent) to 2,448 (36.6 percent).  Branch was unopposed for a second four-year school board term in 1994, but he served less than a year thereafter because he resigned from the board to run for the State Senate. Branch was succeeded on the School Board by Jay Devall, winner of an all-Republican special election to complete the remaining three years of the term.

In 1994, Branch was among those honored by the Baton Rouge Business Report in the "Forty Under 40" category. Also cited were future U.S. Senator Mary Landrieu and later U.S. Representative Cleo Fields.

In the primary election for the state Senate seat, held on October 21, 1995, Branch defeated Cross, 23,002 (53.5 percent) to 20,002 (46.5 percent), an exact 3,000-vote margin. Branch did not seek reelection in the nonpartisan blanket primary in 1999 and was succeeded by Heulette Fontenot. In the Senate, Branch served on the Commerce & Consumer Protection, Education, Judiciary B, and Retirement committees. He was the Vice Chairman of the Education Committee.

References

1965 births
Living people
Place of birth missing (living people)
Politicians from Baton Rouge, Louisiana
Republican Party Louisiana state senators
School board members in Louisiana
Louisiana State University alumni
United States Army officers
American United Methodists